Shi Hengxia (born 1977), better known by her nickname Sister Furong, is a woman from Wugong County, Shaanxi Province, China who received worldwide notoriety in 2005 for her postings on the Internet.

Shi Hengxia is often referred to as frjj, short for "Furong Jiejie", which literally means "Sister Lotus".

Name
Shi Hengxia is better known by her nickname,  in Chinese, which could be translated partially as Sister Furong or fully as Sister Lotus (Flower) or Sister (cotton-rose) Hibiscus (Flower) in English. "'' is the Chinese name for a flower which has always been used to describe young beauty."

Fame
Sister Furong "did not have an easy time with the country's college entrance system. It took her three tries to get into college, and since graduation, she has set her eyes on two of the country's best schools." Over several years, she tried but failed to gain entrance to either of two top Beijing universities (Tsinghua University and Peking University) for postgraduate studies. She posted the story of her determination and pictures of herself on the Internet bulletin boards of those universities and touched a nerve among students. She responded to the attention by adding a quest for a boyfriend to her postings. Her narcissistic self descriptions provoked controversy and the question, "Is she funny simply because she doesn't know she is?".

Sister Furong’s popularity is indicative of the growing trend of Chinese female bloggers (such as Liu Mang Yan and Mu Zimei) who have become famous for talking openly about sex and relationships in a culture still considered sexually repressive.

Sister Furong is a self-proclaimed dance expert, and has danced in many television and public appearances. Her signature pose is the “S-figure,” in which she bends her knees and thrusts out her chest provocatively.

There was blanket coverage in early 2005 by newspapers, magazines and television about her, but since then, media coverage of Furong Jiejie has largely died down, partially due to pressure from the Chinese government’s Propaganda Department. Other forms of media in China are predominantly local rather than national, making the Internet an even more popular tool for staying current with events happening across the country. Such was the case with Furong Jiejie, whose popularity arose within the Internet community. Both the government and traditional media outlets did not pick up on her story until much later.

Expert Commentary

Furong Jiejie's celebrity status has attracted commentary from experts in academia and media. Many consider her to be the pioneer of internet celebrity in China, and an embodiment of wider trends in the production of celebrity as individualistic, opportunistic and commodified figures who achieve fame not through merit but via narcissistic self-promotion and increasingly, in the online world of user generated blogs and forums. As I.D Roberts, a China studies scholar and author writes in his book chapter on Furong Jiejie 
China's Internet Celebrity: Furong Jiejie, her rise to fame is also indicative of  contemporary developments in China - with regard to the rise of its internet culture, the nature of state censorship, and the changing cultural standards and social mores of the Chinese public. As Roberts concludes, .

Public Response
Public reaction to Furong Jiejie is mixed. Some view her as a brave and empowering figure, pushing the boundaries of government censorship and asserting her individuality. Zhang Yiwu, a Peking University specialist in modern culture, explains, “In one sense, the phenomenon of Sister Lotus is the victory of common people.” However, others question her popularity, wondering how she became an overnight sensation when her fame is based upon what they view as shameless self-humiliation, and criticizing her for being a negative influence on Chinese youth.

Government response
When her cult status began to sweep the whole country, Beijing authorities acted. In July 2005, authorities told the country's top blog host to move Furong-related content to low-profile parts of the site. Communist party censors also barred the broadcast of a TV program about Sister Lotus prepared by China Central Television, mainland China’s primary television network.

The Chinese government’s censorship of Sister Furong is part of the growing issue of technology usage in China. According to Chen Changeng, deputy dean of Peking University’s School of Journalism and Communications, “The government sees the Internet as vital for China’s technological progress but, at the same time, they want to stop people from accessing content they see as unhealthy.”

The Chinese government is increasing its efforts to regulate Internet bloggers. On September 24, 2005, China’s Ministry of Information, Industry and the State Council released regulations that ban the usage of sexually explicit content on the web, a measure which some analysts believe is aimed at bloggers. In typical self-praising form, Furong Jiejie responded to the government censorship by saying, “When I first heard about it I was really disappointed. My friends all said the government should be encouraging a positive, helpful girl like me.” However, media regulation policies are still being newly developed in China, and as a result, Furong-related Internet activity is sometimes permitted because of ambiguity in media regulation.

Future
Beijing-based film production company Zongbo Media hired her to star in a series of short films shot on digital video that would be broadcast only online, Zongbo chairman Chen Weiming told Reuters.

She quit her job at a publishing house, has auditioned for a soap opera, and says "I am preparing for a career as an anchorwoman." Sister Furong recently began writing a book in which she encourages young Chinese to follow her lead and persist despite obstacles. However, there are rumors that her publisher has pulled out of the book deal.

On December 29, 2007, she posted on her blog a marriage proposal from the recently divorced French president Nicolas Sarkozy. Many believed that this is simply a hoax, and the timing of the so-called proposal suggests a rivalry between Furong and another Chinese celebrity Yang Erche Namu, given that Yang proposed to Sarkozy just a few days earlier.

In July 2008, she held her first live concert in Beijing.

Quotes by Sister Furong

"My friends all said the government should be encouraging a positive, helpful girl like me."
"To men, I am the sweetest flower. They love to drink my nectar."
"I have a pair of beautiful hands which go harmoniously with my outstandingly slim body."
"My skin is as smooth as a that of baby."
"All of these talents have helped me to become a good dancer. I understand life in my dance; I am looking for my lover in my dance."
"I'm pure and noble (this is how my classmates describe me, which isn't my fault)."
"My life is now so annoying. All the time I am the focus on the street. Why do the eyes of men fall hot upon me? I have no place to hide."
"My sexy appearance and ice-and-jade pure quality bring me a lot of attention wherever I go. I'm always the centre of everything. People never tire of looking at my face, and my physique gives men nose-bleeds."

See also
Muzi Mei
Sister Feng
William Hung
Honglaowai
Papi Jiang

References

Further reading 
 I.D. Roberts (2010) ‘China’s Internet Celebrity: Furong Jiejie’ in Jeffreys, Elaine. & Edwards, Louise (eds.), Celebrity in China, Hong Kong University Press, Hong Kong pp. 217–236.

External links
Sister Furong's blog
EastSouthWestNorth — a different take on Shi Hengxia's situation

Chinese bloggers
Chinese women bloggers
1977 births
Living people
People's Republic of China writers
Writers from Xianyang
Internet memes
Chinese Internet celebrities